Willie Sanderson is a Scottish curler.

Teams

References

External links
 

Living people
Scottish male curlers
Scottish curling champions
Year of birth missing (living people)